Mouth Harp Blues is an album by blues musician Shakey Jake Harris recorded in 1960 and released on the Bluesville label the following year.

Reception

AllMusic reviewer Bill Dahl stated: "When Harris returned to New Jersey later that same year to wax his Bluesville encore, he brought along fellow Chicagoan Jimmie Lee Robinson as his guitarist. A full rhythm section was used this time (New York cats all), but the overall approach was quite a bit closer to what he was used to hearing on Chicago's West side". The Penguin Guide to Blues Recordings considers the accompaniment to be not entirely suited to Harris’s style, and the album not to be one of his best.

Track listing
All compositions by Jimmy D. Harris (Shakey Jake) except where noted 
 "Mouth Harp Blues" – 5:00
 "Love My Baby" – 3:15
 "Jake's Cha Cha" – 2:05
 "Gimme a Smile" – 4:25
 "My Broken Heart" – 3:10
 "Angry Lover" (Armand "Jump" Jackson) – 3:00
 "Things Is Alright" – 2:15
 "Easy Baby" – 5:00
 "Things Are Different Baby" (Ozzie Cadena) – 5:15
 "It Won't Happen Again" – 2:10

Personnel

Performance
Shakey Jake – harmonica, vocals
Jimmie Lee – guitar
Robert Banks – piano
Leonard Gaskin – bass
Junior Blackmon – drums

Production
Ozzie Cadena – supervision
 Rudy Van Gelder – engineer

References

Shakey Jake Harris albums
1961 albums
Bluesville Records albums
Albums recorded at Van Gelder Studio
Albums produced by Esmond Edwards